Korpule is a settlement in the Municipality of Šmarje pri Jelšah in eastern Slovenia. It lies in the hills above the right bank of Šmarje Creek east of Šmarje itself. The area is part of the traditional region of Styria and is now included in the Savinja Statistical Region.

References

External links
Korpule at Geopedia

Populated places in the Municipality of Šmarje pri Jelšah